Alexandre-Théodore-Victor, comte de Lameth (20 October 176018 March 1829) was a French soldier and politician.

Life
Alexandre Lameth was born in Paris on 20 October 1760 and was the youngest child of Marie Thérèse de Broglie. His mother was the sister of the Maréchal de Broglie and a favourite of Marie Antoinette. His other two brothers were, Théodore Lameth (1756–1854), who served in the American war, sat in the Legislative Assembly as deputy from the department of Jura, and became maréchal-de-camp; and Charles Malo François Lameth, who was a popular politician and a hero of the American War of Independence. He served in the American War of Independence as a colonel in the Royal Lorraine Regiment under Rochambeau. He was also a Knight of the Order of Malta like his brother Charles Lameth. Like many other veterans from the American War of Independence, and those among the French Patriot Party, Lameth became friends with Thomas Jefferson. His commitment to moderate constitutional and social reform gathered him respect in the eyes of Jefferson, given his idea for a unicameral, influential legislature. Several American newspapers would publish his speeches of what took place during the National Assembly, and his stances on private property, the Civil Constitution of the Clergy, etc.  Alexandre-Théodore-Victor was a member of the Society of the Cincinnati from France.

Alexandre Lameth, Adrien Duport , and Barnave were brought together on September 1789 for the first time during the first struggles of the Patriot Party. Despite the odds against them, their political ties strengthened and became a profound friendship that lasted through the turmoil. In the Constituent Assembly they formed a "Triumvirate," which controlled a group of about forty deputies forming the advanced left of the Assembly. He presented a famous report in the Constituent Assembly on the organization of the army, but is better known by his eloquent speech on 28 February 1791, at the Jacobin Club, against Honoré Mirabeau, whose relations with the court were beginning to be suspected, and who was a personal enemy of Lameth.  During the next months, as leaders of the Feuillant club, they established their belief that the flight of the King to Varennes was all because of the faulty revolutionary process that prohibited any manner of compromise. They intended to rule out both the Republicans and Democrats, so there would be as much compromise as possible. Their main intention was to end the war as soon as possible while still maintaining the gains of the revolution by passing the Constitution. Their hopes for moderate reform were sullied by the radical turn of the Revolution.
 
He served in the army as maréchal-de-camp under Nicolas Luckner and the Marquis de la Fayette, but was accused of treason on 12 August 1792 for protesting against the Attack on the Tuileries. Once he fled the country, Lameth as well as Gilbert du Motier, Marquis de Lafayette, Bureaux de Pusy, and Latour-Maubourg, former members of the Constituent Assembly, were captured by Austrians. They were held in dungeons for seven years.

After his release, he went into business at Hamburg with his brother Charles and the duc d'Aiguillon, and did not return to France until the Consulate. Under the Empire, he was made prefect successively in several departments, and in 1810 was declared a Baron of the Empire. In 1814, he attached himself to the Bourbons, and under the Restoration was appointed prefect of Somme, deputy for Seine-Inférieure and finally deputy for Seine-et-Oise, in which capacity he was a leader of the Liberal opposition.

He wrote various novels and articles, his two most prominent being: Histoire de l'Assemblée constituante and Mémoires
publiés avec introduction et notes par Eugène Welvert. In Histoire de l'Assemblée constituante, he introduced this work by displaying how he did not wish to write a book of biased anecdotes, nor provide a side of the revolution that states he was a main player, even though he was in a position to recall the most prominent events. He wanted to present an accurate, detailed description of the work of the Constituent Assembly.

References

External links
 Society of the Cincinnati
 American Revolution Institute

1760 births
1829 deaths
Politicians from Paris
Counts of France
Barons of the First French Empire
Jacobins
Feuillants
Members of the National Constituent Assembly (France)
Members of the Chamber of Peers of the Hundred Days
Members of the Chamber of Deputies of the Bourbon Restoration
Prefects of France
Prefects of Somme (department)
Burials at Père Lachaise Cemetery
French prisoners of war in the 18th century
Knights of the Order of Saint Louis
Order of Saint Louis recipients
French military personnel of the American Revolutionary War